Diego Aguilar Acuña (born 13 November 1946) is a Mexican politician from the Institutional Revolutionary Party. He has served as Deputy of the LVII and LX Legislatures of the Mexican Congress representing Sinaloa.

References

1946 births
Living people
Politicians from Sinaloa
People from Guasave
Members of the Chamber of Deputies (Mexico) for Sinaloa
Institutional Revolutionary Party politicians
21st-century Mexican politicians
20th-century Mexican politicians
Members of the Congress of Sinaloa
Deputies of the LVII Legislature of Mexico
Deputies of the LX Legislature of Mexico